Yarborough Landing is a census-designated place in Little River County, Arkansas, United States. Per the 2020 census, the population was 457.

Geography
The community is in northeastern Little River County, on the southwest shore of Millwood Lake, a reservoir on the Little River. Arkansas Highway 317 has its northern terminus in Yarborough Landing and leads south  to Arkansas Highway 32, the road connecting Ashdown and Saratoga.

Demographics

2020 census

Note: the US Census treats Hispanic/Latino as an ethnic category. This table excludes Latinos from the racial categories and assigns them to a separate category. Hispanics/Latinos can be of any race.

References

Census-designated places in Little River County, Arkansas
Census-designated places in Arkansas